Kings Hill/Southwest Salmon Street is a closed light rail station in Portland, Oregon, United States, which prior to closure had been served by the Blue and Red lines of TriMet's MAX Light Rail. The station is situated within the Goose Hollow neighborhood. Its incorrectly punctuated name refers to the hillside to the west of the station, which has historically been referred to as King's Hill. A section of King's Hill, which contains many historic buildings, qualified for inclusion within the King's Hill Historic District, the easternmost boundary of which is at SW 21st Avenue.

Description and history

The station is located in the center of SW 18th Avenue and has a single platform between the tracks. The platforms are accessed from the left-hand side of the train.

Despite the Providence Park eastbound station being only two blocks away, the station was added at the request of the neighborhood.  It provides service to Lincoln High School and the Multnomah Athletic Club.  Though one of the least-used downtown MAX stations, in 2006 a new condominium development nearby was expected to boost ridership.

Public art
Artwork around the station recalls Tanner Creek, which was buried and infilled early in Portland's history, and a bronze goose paying tribute to the Goose Hollow neighborhood. The Simpsons creator Matt Groening etched Bart Simpson into the east sidewalk of SW 18th Avenue in 1996 during the construction of this station.  The City of Portland has opted to leave the sidewalk intact.  SW 18th Avenue runs behind Lincoln High School, where Groening graduated in 1972.

Bus line connections

When in operation, this MAX station was served by the following bus lines:
15-Belmont/NW 23rd Ave
51-Vista
63-Washington Park

References

External links

Station information (with northbound/eastbound ID number) from TriMet
Station information (with southbound/westbound ID number) from TriMet
MAX Light Rail Stations – more general TriMet page

1997 establishments in Oregon
2020 disestablishments in Oregon
Goose Hollow, Portland, Oregon
MAX Blue Line
MAX Light Rail stations
MAX Red Line
Railway stations in Portland, Oregon
Railway stations in the United States opened in 1997
Railway stations closed in 2020